Franz Wittmann (born 7 April 1950 in Ramsau) is an Austrian rally driver, who won the 1987 Rally New Zealand, a round of the World Rally Championship (WRC).

Career
Wittmann began rallying in 1970. He competed mainly on a national level during his career, winning the Austrian championship 12 times between 1976 and 2001. He also won 32 rounds of the European Rally Championship, finishing second in the standings in 1978. As a test driver for Audi, he debuted the revolutionary Audi Quattro in 1981. He also competed as a factory Volkswagen driver in 1985 and 1986. In 1987 he won Rally New Zealand in a privately entered Lancia Delta HF 4WD. He competed on his final WRC event at the 1989 Rally Australia.

Wittmann's son Franz Jr. also competes in rallying.

WRC victories
{|class="wikitable"
! # 
!Event
!Season
!Co-driver
!Car
|-
|1
| 18th Rally New Zealand
|1987
|Jörg Pattermann
|Lancia Delta HF 4WD
|}

References

External links
Official website 

Living people
1950 births
World Rally Championship drivers
Austrian rally drivers
Audi Sport drivers
Volkswagen Motorsport drivers